Encephalosphaera is a genus of flowering plants belonging to the family Acanthaceae.

Its native range is Western South America to Northern Brazil.

Species:

Encephalosphaera lasiandra 
Encephalosphaera puberula 
Encephalosphaera vitellina

References

Acanthaceae
Acanthaceae genera